Guanylate cyclase soluble subunit beta-1 is an enzyme that in humans is encoded by the GUCY1B3 gene.

Function 

Soluble guanylate cyclase (sGC), a heterodimeric protein consisting of an alpha and a beta subunit, catalyzes the conversion of GTP to the second messenger cGMP and functions as the main receptor for nitric oxide and nitrovasodilator drugs.

Interactions 

GUCY1B3 has been shown to interact with Heat shock protein 90kDa alpha (cytosolic), member A1 and Endothelial NOS.

References

Further reading 

EC 4.6.1